Larry Richard Oliver (October 6, 1952 – March 5, 2020) was an American professional wrestler, known as "Crippler" Rip Oliver, who had success in Pacific Northwest Wrestling (PNW).

Early life
Oliver was born in Florida. His father was Dennis Lee Oliver (December 1922 – August 1980) and his mother was Sadie Lenore Head Oliver. His parents owned Independent Fish Company, located on Seminole Place on the Homosassa River. His parents are buried in Stagestand Cemetery in Homosassa.

Professional wrestling career
In Pacific Northwest Wrestling (PNW), he set a record for holding the NWA Pacific Northwest Heavyweight Championship more than anyone. Oliver also had many titles in tag team competition, holding the NWA Pacific Northwest Tag Team Championship and the NWA Canadian Tag Team Championship a combined 18 times. In 1985 Chris Adams allowed his tag team partner Gino Hernandez to defend the WCCW Television Championship against Billy Jack Haynes, where he lost that title, but Oliver defeated and severely injured Billy to win the television title soon thereafter.

After wrestling in PNW, Oliver began to wrestle for the World Wrestling Federation (WWF), and worked mainly as a jobber. During his run, Oliver appeared once on Saturday Night's Main Event XVIII, going by the name of Super Ninja, challenging The Ultimate Warrior for the WWF Intercontinental Championship. During his many title reigns Oliver faced many wrestlers such as Rocky Johnson, Brett Sawyer, Billy Jack Haynes, Buddy Rose, Bobby Jaggers, Stan Stasiak, Larry Hennig, Curt Hennig, Brian Adams, Jay Youngblood, Steve Regal, Roddy Piper, Tom Zenk, and Buzz Sawyer. After leaving the WWF Oliver would return to PNW in 1990. He wrestled his last match on October 12, 1991, losing the NWA Pacific Northwest Heavyweight Championship to Demolition Crush.

Lawsuit
In July 2016, Oliver was part of a class action lawsuit filed against WWE which alleged that wrestlers incurred traumatic brain injuries during their tenure and that the company concealed the risks of injury. The suit was litigated by attorney Konstantine Kyros, who has been involved in a number of other lawsuits against WWE. US District Judge Vanessa Lynne Bryant dismissed the lawsuit in September 2018.

Death
In early 2020, it was revealed that Oliver had entered into hospice care due to end-stage heart failure. He died on March 5, 2020, surrounded by his family.

Championships and accomplishments
NWA All-Star Wrestling
NWA Canadian Tag Team Championship (Vancouver version) (2 times) - with Fidel Cortez (1) and Buddy Rose (1)
Oregon Wrestling Federation
OWF Heavyweight Championship (1 time)
Pacific Northwest Wrestling
NWA Pacific Northwest Heavyweight Championship (12 times)
NWA Pacific Northwest Tag Team Championship (16 times) - with Fidel Cortez (1), David Sierra (7), Buddy Rose (2), Matt Borne (2), Bobby Jaggers (1), Mike Miller (1), Super Ninja (1), and Larry Oliver (1)
Ring Around The Northwest Newsletter
Tag Team of the Year (1981–1984) with Buddy Rose and The Assassin
Wrestler of the Year (1982–1984, 1986)
World Class Championship Wrestling
WCCW Television Championship (1 time)

References

External links
CWF Archives

Brainy History

1952 births
2020 deaths
People from Citrus County, Florida
American male professional wrestlers
Sportspeople from Florida
Sportspeople from Portland, Oregon
Stampede Wrestling alumni